Alikomektepe is an ancient settlement located in Jalilabad District (Azerbaijan), in the Mugan plain, belonging to the Chalcolithic period, dating to c. 5000 BC. Early levels belonged to the Shulaveri-Shomu culture. It covers an area of over 1 hectare.

Description
Materials from this site are very close to the materials obtained from monuments of northwestern Iran (Dalma ware). The artifacts of the lower level are similar to those at Kültəpə I in Nakhchivan. In the upper levels, there is also pottery of the northern Ubaid period type.

There was numerous earthenware found during the excavations. More than 300 samples of painted pottery covered with monochrome drawings were found. Most of the brown and red drawings are triangles, rhombuses, containing straight and curved lines. Many items from Alikomektepe are considered as locally produced.

Alikomek-Kultepe culture
Some archaeologists speak of the ancient Alikomek-Kultepe culture of southeastern Caucasus, which followed the Shulaveri-Shomu culture, and covered the transition from the Neolithic to Chalcolithic periods (c. 4500 BC).

According to A. Courcier,

"Situated respectively at the border of the Mugan Steppe and in Nakhichevan (Azerbaijan), the settlements of Alikemek and Kul’tepe I were excavated in the 1950s–1970s and are not dated with certainty. They probably represent a relatively long period and occupation seems to have started early (probably during the sixth millennium BCE) (Lyonnet 2008, pp. 4–6). The Alikemek–Kul’tepe culture covered the Ararat Plain, Nakhichevan, the Mil’skoj and Mugan Steppes and the region around Lake Urmia in north-western Iran" (Kushnareva 1997, p. 33).

See also
History of Azerbaijan
Aratashen
Kul Tepe Jolfa, Iran

Notes

Bibliography
Bertille LYONNET, Farhad GULIYEV (2010), Recent discoveries on the Neolithic and Chalcolithic of Western Azerbaijan. TUBA-AR, TURKISH ACADEMY OF SCIENCES JOURNAL OF ARCHAEOLOGY 13, 219-228
V Bakhshaliyev, A Seyidov, New findings from the settlement of Sadarak (Nakhchivan-Azerbaijan) - Anatolia Antiqua, 2013 - persee.fr

External links
ARCHEOLOGY, REPUBLIC OF AZERBAIJAN iranicaonline.org

Prehistoric sites in Azerbaijan
Archaeological sites in Azerbaijan